Charlemont is a stop on the Luas light-rail tram system in Dublin, Ireland.  It opened in 2004 as a stop on the Green Line from St Stephen's Green station to Sandyford. It provides access to the Portobello area and the Cathal Brugha Barracks.

The platforms of Charlemont are located on a steel and concrete beam bridge which crosses the Grand Canal.  The waiting shelters are located directly above the canal itself.  The advantage of this layout is that the stop can be accessed from either side of the canal: on the south side, a staircase and lift lead from the Grand Parade to the northbound platform.  On the north side, staircases lead from each of the platforms to Charlemont Place, but this end does not have step free access.  Since the Luas does not have ticket barriers, the bridge can also be used by pedestrians to cross the canal.  The bridge has been dedicated to Professor Simon H. Perry, a civil engineer who lead the campaign for a light railway in Dublin.  The arrangement of a station on a bridge over water has since been implemented on a much larger scale at London Blackfriars station.

To the south of Charlemont, trams continue south on a viaduct built for the Harcourt Street railway line which ran along this alignment from 1854 to 1958.  To the north, trams cross Charlemont Place and descend a ramp, continuing through the city centre on the streets.  Trams generally run every 5–10 minutes.  Northbound trams terminate at Parnell or continue to Broombridge.  Southbound trams terminate at Sandyford or continue to Brides Glen.  Charlemont is also served by Dublin Bus routes 44, 44B and 61.

References

Luas Green Line stops in Dublin (city)